The official flag of Ottawa is highlighted by a stylized white "O" design. This stylized O is meant to represent both a maple leaf (symbolizing Canada) and the Peace Tower and Centre Block of the parliament buildings (symbolizing Ottawa). The design is meant to be simple, but look festive, and to create a feeling of vibrant motion when flying.

The design uses the blue and teal colours chosen to represent the new City of Ottawa. The blue is symbolic of rivers and waterways that are part of the Ottawa region, such as the Ottawa River. The large teal areas speak to the large green space and quality of life in the area, as well as the forests, trees, and parkland within the city. It was adopted January 1, 2000, following the creation of the Ottawa "megacity".

History 
Previously the Ottawa flag had been a purple, red and blue  tricolour. This flag was adopted by the city in 1901 and when replaced, it was the oldest municipal flag in Canada. The three colours were intended to represent purple for the monarchy, red for the Liberals, and blue for the Conservatives. The flag was not popular, however, with few liking its appearance. It also violated rules of heraldry by placing colour next to colour. In 1987, in an attempt to spruce it up, the city's coat of arms was added to the centre. There was little controversy when the transition board decided the new city should get a new flag.

References

External links 

 Flag of Ottawa

Culture of Ottawa
Municipal government of Ottawa
Ottawa
Ottawa